The spotted drum or spotted ribbonfish (Equetus punctatus), is a species of marine fish in the family Sciaenidae.

The spotted drum is widespread throughout the tropical waters of the occidental Atlantic Ocean from South Florida to Brazil including by the way the Bermuda, the Bahamas, the Gulf of Mexico and the Caribbean Sea.

A nocturnal feeder, it leaves the protection of its daily shelter at night to feed mainly on small crustaceans and Polychaete worms.

References

External links

http://www.marinespecies.org/aphia.php?p=taxdetails&id=276097
http://fran.cornu.free.fr/affichage/affichage_nom.php?id_espece=420 
 

Fish described in 1801
Fish of the Atlantic Ocean
Sciaenidae
Fish of the Dominican Republic